Carysfort Reef Light is located approximately six nautical miles east of Key Largo, Florida. The lighthouse has an iron screw-pile foundation with a platform, and a skeletal, octagonal, pyramidal tower, which is painted red. It was the oldest functioning lighthouse of its type in the United States until it was decommissioned in 2015, having been completed in 1852. The light currently installed is a xenon flashtube beacon. It was added to the National Register of Historic Places in 1984.

Caesar and Florida
The original Carysfort Reef light was a lightship named Caesar, starting in 1825. Caesar was built in New York City. While being sailed to its station, it went aground near Key Biscayne during a storm, and its crew abandoned the ship. The ship was salvaged by wreckers and taken to Key West, Florida. The owners bought the ship back and it was placed on station at Carysfort Reef. The lightship was often blown off-station by storms, and even went aground on the reef at one point. That first lightship had to be replaced after only five years because of dry rot.

The second lightship was named Florida.

Lightship keeper
Both lightships were captained by John Whalton, who at the age of 25 won his initial appointment as commander of the Caesar, in 1825. After the Cape Florida Lighthouse was burned by Seminoles in 1836, the Carysfort Reef lightship became the only navigational light on the Florida coast between St. Augustine and Key West. In 1836, Seminoles attacked Capt. Whalton and four of his helpers as they went ashore on Key Largo to tend their garden at Garden Cove, Key Largo. Capt. Whalton and one helper were killed, and two of the other three were wounded, but the three managed to escape back to the ship, where the rest of the seven man crew awaited, along with Capt. Whalton's wife and daughter, who at the time were visiting from Key West.

New lighthouse
Congress appropriated funds for a lighthouse at Carysfort Reef in the 1840s. It was the third screw-pile lighthouse in the United States. The interchangeable parts were manufactured in 1848 in Philadelphia, Pennsylvania, and a construction crew was trained there. The erection of the lighthouse was more difficult than expected. The site was under four-and-a-half feet of water, and the reef was not solid, as expected, but consisted of a hard shell over compacted sand. The plans had to be modified by adding large plates to the piles to spread the weight of the lighthouse over a larger area of the reef. When the supervisor of the construction died, the US Army Corps of Topographical Engineers sent Lieutenant George Meade (later commander of the Army of the Potomac and victor at Gettysburg) to complete the project. This was Meade's first command of a lighthouse project.

Original structure
The original lens was a first-order Fresnel lens. The structure originally had a balcony that encircled the enclosed, circular light keeper's quarters. The balcony and its railing were later removed.

Head keepers

 Courtland P. Williams (1852 – 1853)
 William Richardson (1853 – 1854)
 Ezra Harris (1854 – 1856)
 Martin McIntyre (1856 – 1858)
 William C. Green (1858 – 1860)
 John Jones (1860 – 1863)
 Charles Bowman (1863 – 1866)
 Charles W. Russell (1866)
 Harry W. Ramsdell (1866 – 1869)
 Edward Bell (1869 – 1881)
 H.W. Magill (1881)
 Fred A. Brost (1881 – 1885)
 Martin Weatherford (1885 – 1886)
 William Lester (1886 – 1894)
 Francis McNulty (1894 – 1903)
 Miguel Fabal (1903 – at least 1912)
 Charles H. Williams (at least 1913)
 Charles Johnson (1915 – ), 
 Thomas L. Kelly (1918 – 1919)
 William H. Curry (1919)
 Thomas L. Kelly (1919 – 1922)
 Captain Pierce ( – 1927)
 Alexander B. Jenks (1927 – at least 1936)
 Leonard L. Galloway (1940 – at least 1941)
 Wallace L. Lester (1942 – at least 1948)

Availability
On February 1, 2019 it was announced that the lighthouse would be given away freely to any government agencies, educational agencies, non-profit corporations, or any community development organizations who wanted to use it for "educational, park, recreational, cultural or historic preservation purposes."  This is in accordance with the National Historic Lighthouse Preservation Act. If none request it, then it will be auctioned off to anyone else who does.

See also

 List of lighthouses in Florida
 List of lighthouses in the United States

References

Sources
 McCarthy, Kevin M. (1990) "Cape Florida Lighthouse." Florida Lighthouses. (pp. 41–44). University of Florida Press.
  .
 Swanson, Gail. (2005) Slave Ship Guerrero. West Conshohocken, Pennsylvania: Infinity Publishing. 
 HMS Carysfort ship's log on grounding

External links

Florida Keys Reef Lights Foundation

Lighthouses completed in 1852
Lighthouses in Monroe County, Florida
1852 establishments in Florida